The Carolina hammerhead (Sphyrna gilberti) is a species of hammerhead shark, and part of the family Sphyrnidae, found in the western Atlantic Ocean. Their pupping grounds are in nearshore waters off the southeastern U.S. with the highest concentrations found in Bulls Bay, South Carolina. The Carolina hammerhead has also been found in nearshore waters off of Brazil. It was formally described in 2013.

Little is known about the habits of the species. It is a sister species to S. lewini.  The Carolina hammerhead is named in honor of Carter Gilbert, who unknowingly recorded the first known specimen of the shark off Charleston, South Carolina, in 1967.  Dr. Gilbert, who was the curator of the Florida Museum of Natural History from 1961–1998, caught what he believed was an anomalous scalloped hammerhead shark with 10 fewer vertebrae than a typical scalloped hammerhead.  It was not confirmed to be a different species altogether until Quattro's discovery in 2013.

References

Carolina hammerhead
Natural history of South Carolina
Carolina hammerhead